Mija Martina Barbarić (born 26 April 1984) is a singer and TV host from Bosnia and Herzegovina who used to work as a  spokeswoman for the Ministry of Tourism and Environment of  Federation of Bosnia and Herzegovina.

She represented Bosnia and Herzegovina in the Eurovision Song Contest 2003 with the song "Ne brini". She also provided the results of the Bosnia and Herzegovina televote in the Eurovision Song Contest 2004.

She was also organizer of special events during the biggest Economy Fair in Mostar (for Mostar Inc.) for 10 years.

Barbarić was accused of neo-Nazi sympathies after she wrote on her Facebook profile Za dom spremni, controversial salute used by the fascist Ustaše movement in Croatia during World War II as equivalent of the Nazi salute Sieg heil.

References

1985 births
Living people
Eurovision Song Contest entrants for Bosnia and Herzegovina
21st-century Bosnia and Herzegovina women singers
Musicians from Mostar
Croats of Bosnia and Herzegovina
Eurovision Song Contest entrants of 2003